Hypogastrura is a genus of springtails and allies in the family Hypogastruridae. There are at least 150 described species in the genus. Their name means ‘lack of a stomach tail’.

See also
 List of Hypogastrura species

References

Poduromorpha
Springtail genera